Ernest Willington Skeats (1 November 1875 – 20 January 1953) was an English-Australian geologist and academic

Skeats was born in Berais Town, Southampton, England, son of Frank George Skeats, a bank clerk and his wife Alice Erena Martin and was educated at Handel and Hartley colleges, Southampton, and entered the Royal College of Science, London, where he received a D.Sc. in geology in 1902.

Skeats moved to Australia in 1904, succeeding John Walter Gregory in the chair of geology and mineralogy at the University of Melbourne. He specialised in petrology and stratigraphy.

Skeats was President of the Royal Society of Victoria 1910–1911.

He was elected president of the Australasian Institute of Mining and Metallurgy for 1925.

He won the Clarke Medal, awarded by the Royal Society of New South Wales in 1929.

References

Thomas A. Darragh, 'Skeats, Ernest Willington (1875-1953)', Australian Dictionary of Biography, Vol. 11, MUP, 1988, pp 619–620. 
Skeats, Ernest Willington (1875 - 1953) at Bright Sparcs, Melbourne University

1875 births
1953 deaths
Geologists from Melbourne
Scientists from Southampton
Alumni of the University of Southampton
English emigrants to Australia
19th-century Australian scientists
20th-century Australian scientists